Maru Nihoniho is the founder and managing director of Metia Interactive, and is also the designer and developer of several video games such as Sparx.

Life and Career 
Nihoniho was born in New Zealand in 1973, and has indicated an interest in video games since the age of 11.

In 2003, she founded the Metia Interactive company. Metia Interactive's debut game, Cube, was released on the PlayStation Portable in 2007.

Following Cube's release, Nihoniho was approached by the University of Auckland to develop a self-help game to combat depression. This game was specifically made with New Zealand's Māori and minority ethnic groups in mind. Sparx was the resulting product released in 2013. The game was developed and modeled on cognitive behavioral therapy.

In 2017, during her last year at Tech Futures Lab, she developed Takaro as her key project. Takaro was an educational game aimed at children.

In 2017, Maru Nihoniho finished her master's degree in Technological Futures with the Tech Futures Lab.

Nihoniho went on to develop several games, such as Guardian Maia, with the stated goal of introducing others to Māori culture.

Awards 
Nihoniho won the New Zealand Order of Merit 2016 for her work in gaming and mental health.

She was named Innovator of the year in the 2017 MCV Pacific Women in Games Awards, presented by Xbox.

She was named 2018's Māori Entrepreneur of the Year 2018.

In 2018 Forbes named her as one of the top 50 women in Tech.

References 

Living people
New Zealand women company founders
New Zealand Māori people
Women video game designers
1972 births